Volčji Grad is a village in the Municipality of Komen in the Littoral region of Slovenia.

The local church is dedicated to John the Baptist and belongs to the Parish of Komen.

References

External links
Volčji Grad on Geopedia
Volčji Grad local community site 

Populated places in the Municipality of Komen